Stord may refer to:

 Stord, municipality in Norway
 Stord (island), island in Norway
 Leirvik, town of Stord
 Stord (company), supply chain management company
 HNoMS Stord, two ships of the Royal Norwegian Navy